Mahogany Soul is the second studio album by American singer Angie Stone. It was first released in the US on October 16, 2001, by J Records, then in the UK on November 5. In the US, the album sold 71,000 copies in its first week of release. The album spawned five singles: "Brotha", "Brotha Part II", "Wish I Didn't Miss You", "More Than a Woman", and "Bottles & Cans".

Critical reception 

Reviewing for PopMatters in October 2001, Mark Anthony Neal hailed Mahogany Soul as "an accomplished piece of R&B music" in a year with other impressive debut albums by singers in the genre, including Alicia Keys' Songs in A Minor, Bilal's 1st Born Second, and Res's How I Do. He highlighted Stone's detailed lyrics, casually sassy "down-home" persona, and use of sophisticated samples in the context of authentic soul music. In response to the popular reception for the lead single "Brotha", Neal said he regards it as a "passionate and thoughtful defense" of African-American men, while pointing out "brutally trenchant" perspectives of men elsewhere in the album's relationship songs. The Village Voice critic Robert Christgau was less enthusiastic, singling out "Brotha" and "Bottles and Cans" as highlights while finding the album in general to be "longer on groove than song" and "longer on song than the brothas".

Writing in 2009 for BBC Online, Daryl Easlea said Mahogany Soul "remains her masterpiece" and called it "a confident musical statement of what it means to be African-American [that] came to define the neo-soul movement of the early 21st century".

Track listing

Notes
  signifies a co-producer
  signifies a programming producer
  signifies an associate producer
  signifies a remixer and additional producer

Sample credits
 "Snowflakes" contains elements from "Let's Make Love Now" by The Supremes and the Four Tops.
 "Wish I Didn't Miss You" contains elements from "Back Stabbers" by The O'Jays.
 "The Ingredients of Love" contains replayed elements from "Red Clay" by Freddie Hubbard.
 "20 Dollars" contains elements from "Simply Beautiful" by Al Green.
 "Brotha Part II" contains excerpts from "I'll Play the Blues for You" by Albert King.
 "Time of the Month" contains replayed elements from "I Can't Say No" by Natalie Cole.

Personnel
Credits adapted from the liner notes of Mahogany Soul.

Musicians

 Angie Stone – vocals ; bass, percussion ; background vocals ; Rhodes piano ; arrangement ; vocal arrangement ; Wurlitzer ; crowd participation 
 Sherena Wynn – background vocals 
 Tenita Dreher – background vocals 
 Stephanie Bolton – background vocals 
 Eran Tabib – drum programming, keyboards ; acoustic guitar ; guitars ; classical guitar ; drums ; electric guitar ; strings ; all instruments 
 Aubrey Dayle – percussion 
 Raphael Saadiq – guitars, bass 
 Harold Lilly – keyboards ; background vocals 
 Jake and the Phatman – turntables, drum programming 
 Chucky T – drums, bass 
 Daniel Sadownick – percussion 
 Calvin – vocals 
 Clifton Lighty – background vocals 
 Balewa Muhammad – background vocals 
 Swizz Beatz – arrangement 
 Joe Kwimbee – bass, guitars 
 Andrea Martin – background vocals 
 Warryn "Baby Dubb" Campbell – all instruments 
 John "Jubu" Smith – guitar 
 Gerald "Da Clean Up Man" Isaac – arrangement 
 Jonathan DuBose Jr. – guitar 
 Dewey "Bassman" Browder – bass 
 Ray Chew – string arrangements, string conducting 
 Musiq Soulchild – vocals, background vocals, vocal arrangement 
 Carvin Haggins – vocal arrangement 
 Jamar Jones – organ, Rhodes piano 
 Frankie "Rocco" Romano – guitar 
 Ali Shaheed Muhammad – all instruments (except lead guitar) 
 Bob Power – lead guitar 
 Larry Peoples Sr. – bass ; crowd participation 
 Jamal Peoples – Rhodes piano ; organ 
 Larry Peoples Jr. – percussion 
 Rufus Blaq – background vocals 
 Ivan Neville – Hammond B-3 
 Robert Eldridge – tenor saxophone 
 Reginald Hines – alto saxophone 
 Paul Litteral – trumpet 
 Aaron "Freedom" Lyles – Wurlitzer, drums, percussion, crowd participation 
 E. Serrano – crowd participation 
 Rodney Davis – additional keyboards 
 Alicia Keys – vocals 
 Eve – vocals 
 Kerry "Krucial" Brothers – all instruments (except bass), digital programming 
 Rufus Jackson – bass 
 Eric Lorde – additional keyboards

Technical

 Angie Stone – production ; co-production ; executive production
 Eran Tabib – production 
 Tim Donovan – engineering ; recording ; mixing 
 Jon Shriver – engineering 
 Jeremy Mitchell – engineering assistance 
 Rowie Nameri – engineering assistance 
 Steven Maldonado – engineering assistance 
 "Prince" Charles Alexander – mixing 
 Richard Furch – mixing assistance 
 Raphael Saadiq – production 
 Jake and the Phatman – co-production 
 Danny Romero – recording, additional recording 
 Regula Merz – recording assistance 
 Rich Palmer – recording assistance 
 Derek Carlfon – additional recording assistance 
 Chucky T – programming production 
 Flip Osman – engineering ; mixing assistance 
 Paul Oliveira – engineering assistance ; recording assistance, mixing assistance 
 Zach Prewitt – engineering assistance 
 Kyle W. – engineering assistance 
 Tony Maserati – mixing 
 Eddie F – production 
 Darren Lighty – production 
 "You Can Ask" Giz – recording, mixing 
 Erick Ferrell – mixing assistance 
 Kevin Perry – mixing assistance 
 Rufus Blaq – co-production 
 Jason Hariston – associate production 
 Ivan Matias – production 
 Andrea Martin – production 
 Swizz Beatz – co-production 
 Warryn "Baby Dubb" Campbell – production 
 Jan Fairchild – recording 
 Manny Marroquin – mixing 
 Farah Fima – mixing assistance 
 Sandra Campbell – project coordination 
 Gerald "Da Clean Up Man" Isaac – production, recording 
 Edwin Ramos – recording 
 Ivan "Orthodox" Barias – production 
 Carvin "Ransum" Haggins – production 
 Charles "Storm" Martinez – recording 
 Jeff Chestek – recording 
 Serban Ghenea – mixing 
 Ali Shaheed Muhammad – production 
 Claudio Cueni – recording 
 Ian Blanch – recording assistance 
 Bob Power – mixing 
 Aaron "Freedom" Lyles – production, recording 
 Michael Conrader – engineering 
 Jay Nicholas – engineering assistance 
 Halsey Quemere – engineering assistance 
 Jason Tumminello – mixing assistance 
 Kerry "Krucial" Brothers – remix, additional production 
 Tony Black – recording, mixing 
 Peter Edge – executive production
 Breyon Prescott – executive production
 Herb Powers Jr. – mastering

Artwork
 Warwick Saint – photography
 Alli – art direction, design
 Eric Altenburger – digital imaging
 Kenny Gravillis – CD label logo and art
 Chris LeBeau – photo session production

Charts

Weekly charts

Year-end charts

Certifications

Release history

Notes

References

External links 
 

2001 albums
Albums produced by Eddie F
Albums produced by Raphael Saadiq
Albums produced by Swizz Beatz
Albums produced by Warryn Campbell
Albums recorded at Chung King Studios
Angie Stone albums
Arista Records albums
J Records albums